Derrick Isaiah Joe (born July 2, 1999) is an American professional basketball player for the Oklahoma City Thunder of the National Basketball Association (NBA). He played college basketball for the Arkansas Razorbacks.

Early life and high school career
Joe grew up in Fort Smith, Arkansas, where he attended Northside High School alongside Jaylin Williams, his now professional teammate. He shot 41% from three-point range in his sophomore season and committed to play college basketball at the University of Arkansas during the summer going into his junior year over offers from Alabama and Arkansas-Little Rock. As a junior, Joe averaged 18.8 points, 4.5 rebounds and 2.2 steals per game and helped lead the Grizzlies to an Arkansas Activities Association (AAA) 7A state championship and was named first-team All-State. As a senior, Joe averaged 22.8 points, 4.4 rebounds, 3.4 assists and 2.9 steals per game and was named the Gatorade Arkansas Boys Basketball Player of the Year and the State Player of the Year by USA Today as he led Northside to the state title game before eventually falling to North Little Rock High School.

College career
Joe averaged 13.9 points, 2.8 rebounds, 1.7 assists, and 1.5 steals per game over 34 games played as a freshman and was named to the Southeastern Conference (SEC) All-Freshman team. He made 113 three-pointers on 273 attempts (41.4%), breaking the Arkansas record previously held by Scotty Thurman (102) and tying the record for a freshman in the SEC while also leading the conference in three-point percentage. He was also named the SEC Player of the Week after scoring 34 points on 10 of 13 shooting from three (11–14 overall) against FIU on December 1, 2018.

Entering his sophomore season, Joe was named preseason All-SEC and to Jerry West Award watchlist. Joe was also named the 80th-best collegiate basketball player going into the 2019–20 season by CBS Sports and the 33rd-best prospect for the 2020 NBA draft by ESPN. Joe was named the SEC co-Player of the Week on January 2, 2020, following a 24 point, five rebound performance in a 71–64 win against Indiana. Joe scored 34 points, including 26 in the second half, on January 12 to lead Arkansas in a 76–72 comeback win over Ole Miss. On February 4, Joe underwent an arthroscopic procedure on his knee after an MRI revealed inflammation and was ruled out indefinitely. As a sophomore, Joe averaged 16.9 points and 4.1 rebounds per game. Following the season he declared for the 2020 NBA draft. On August 1, Joe announced he was withdrawing from the draft and returning to Arkansas. However, on August 17 he reversed course and left Arkansas for the professional ranks. Joe is also a member of the Phi Beta Sigma Fraternity.

Professional career

Philadelphia 76ers (2020–2022)
Joe was selected with the 49th overall pick in the 2020 NBA draft by the Philadelphia 76ers. On December 3, he signed with the 76ers. Joe made his NBA debut on December 27, 2020, playing seven minutes and scoring two points on 1-of-2 shooting with one rebound, one assist, and one steal in a 118–94 loss to the Cleveland Cavaliers. On October 13, 2022, he was waived.

Oklahoma City Thunder (2022–present)
On October 16, 2022, Joe signed a deal with the Oklahoma City Thunder. On February 24, 2023, Joe scored a career-high 28 points in a 124–115 loss to the Phoenix Suns.

Career statistics

NBA

Regular season

|-
| style="text-align:left;"| 
| style="text-align:left;"| Philadelphia
| 41 || 1 || 9.3 || .361 || .368 || .750 || .9 || .5 || .3 || .1 || 3.7
|-
| style="text-align:left;"| 
| style="text-align:left;"| Philadelphia
| 55 || 1 || 11.1 || .350 || .333 || .935 || 1.0 || .6 || .3 || .1 || 3.6
|- class="sortbottom"
| style="text-align:center;" colspan="2"|Career
| 96 || 2 || 10.3 || .355 || .349 || .855 || 1.0 || .6 || .3 || .1 || 3.7

Playoffs

|-
| style="text-align:left;"|2021
| style="text-align:left;"|Philadelphia
| 4 || 0 || 2.3 || .333 || .000 || — || .0 || .3 || .0 || .0 || .5
|-
| style="text-align:left;"|2022
| style="text-align:left;"|Philadelphia
| 7 || 0 || 2.1 || .400 || .333 || — || .3 || .0 || .0 || .0 || .7
|- class="sortbottom"
| style="text-align:center;" colspan="2"|Career
| 11 || 0 || 2.2 || .375 || .200 || — || .2 || .1 || .0 || .0 || .6

College

|-
| style="text-align:left;"|2018–19
| style="text-align:left;"|Arkansas
| 34 || 34 || 30.1 || .413 || .414 || .756 || 2.8 || 1.7 || 1.5 || .1 || 13.9
|-
| style="text-align:left;"|2019–20
| style="text-align:left;"|Arkansas
| 26 || 25 || 36.1 || .367 || .342 || .890 || 4.1 || 1.7 || 1.4 || .3 || 16.9
|- class="sortbottom"
| style="text-align:center;" colspan="2"|Career
| 60 || 59 || 32.7 || .390 || .378 || .827 || 3.4 || 1.7 || 1.5 || .2 || 15.2

References

External links
 Arkansas Razorbacks bio

1999 births
Living people
21st-century African-American sportspeople
African-American basketball players
American men's basketball players
Arkansas Razorbacks men's basketball players
Basketball players from Arkansas
Delaware Blue Coats players
Oklahoma City Thunder players
Philadelphia 76ers draft picks
Philadelphia 76ers players
Shooting guards
Sportspeople from Fort Smith, Arkansas